Jaime Francisco García Fábregas (born February 28, 1950) is a Filipino actor and musical scorer.

Early life

Jaime Francisco García Fábregas was born in Iriga City, Camarines Sur, Philippines to his parents Pedro Fábregas and Isabel García.

Career
Fábregas began his acting career in theatre before entering show business. He became a part of Repertory Philippines where he acted in many plays and musicals.

Fábregas is a former host of the gag show Sic O'Clock News (IBC 13). He is also a former wrestling segment reporter of Pinoy Wrestling (PTV 4), where he was dubbed the local version of WWE reporter Mean Gene Okerlund.

He is also a musical scorer, having won awards for his works in films. Shake, Rattle & Roll, which was screened at the 1984 Metro Manila Film Festival (MMFF), was the recipient of the Best Music accolade, a film which he did the musical score for. He also did the musical score for Rizal sa Dapitan and Kutob, which were screened at the 1997 and 2005 MMFF, respectively. Both films were given the Best Musical Score award.

Fábregas is best known for his role as Lt. General Delfin S. Borja in the ABS-CBN action-drama series FPJ's Ang Probinsyano, starring Coco Martin. Behind the scenes, he is also the musical director for the show.

Personal life
Fábregas was married to his first wife, Leticia Caballero, with whom he has three children. The couple later annulled. His children with Caballero were former actors - Lara Fábregas, Paolo Fábregas and Minco Fábregas.

He later married his second wife Ma. Consuelo Tordesillas, with whom he has four children. Two of his sons with Tordesillas are musicians - Emilio Fábregas (guitarist of the Filipino band Bonsai! Bonsai!) and Leandro Fábregas (bassist of the Filipino band Rusty Machines).

In addition to his seven children, Fábregas also has twelve grandchildren.

Filmography

Films

Television

As composer

Awards and nominations

References

External links

1950 births
Living people
Bicolano actors
Bicolano people
Filipino film score composers
Filipino male comedians
Filipino people of Spanish descent
Filipino sports announcers
Male actors from Camarines Sur
People from Iriga
GMA Network personalities
ABS-CBN personalities